National freeway 6, also known as Shuishalian Freeway or Central East-West Freeway, is a freeway between Wufeng, Taichung and Puli, Nantou, and all of the main line was already open to traffic on 21 March 2009. The freeway runs parallel with provincial highway 14 for most of its length.

Length
The length is about 37.6 km between Wufeng, Taichung and Puli, Nantou.

Exit List

Background
Its construction began on 25 March 2004. On 27 January 2008, the main line between Ailan IC and Puli terminal was open to traffic. Then, the main line between Wufeng JCT and East Caotun IC, and the East Caotun connection way were open to traffic on 27 December 2008. The other part of main line between east Caotun IC and Ailan IC was already open to traffic on 21 March 2009. Afterwards, Guoxing IC was open to traffic on 22 October 2009. Then, Jiuzheng IC was open to traffic on 31 January 2011. Beishan IC was completed on 21 November 2013.

There is a plan to extend the route further east to Hualien City. However, it is technically difficult due to the mountains between Puli, Nantou and Hualien City.

See also
 Highway system in Taiwan

References

http://www.taneeb.gov.tw/home.htm

Freeway No. 06